The Cancer Survivors Club is a collection of cancer survival stories. Each story is written from the cancer survivor's own perspective.

Summary
The book consists of an introduction and 32 chapters, each featuring different cancer survivors. Included in the book are a number of his newspaper columns.

History 
In an interview, Chris Geiger, a baker from Series 8 of The Great British Bake Off, stated he was diagnosed with non-Hodgkin lymphoma. When first diagnosed he wanted to read stories from other cancer patients who had fought the same cancer as him and survived. This was his original idea behind The Cancer Survivors Club book, as he wanted to read about various treatments, and how people survived the disease. In 2015 Oneworld Publications published this book, giving it a broader audience than when it was originally self published by Geiger in 2013.

References

External links
Oneworld Publications
The Cancer Survivors Club
Cancer Survivors Club on Twitter

2015 non-fiction books
British autobiographies
Books about cancer
Oneworld Publications books